Biezenmortel is a village in the municipality Tilburg in the Dutch province North Brabant. The village had 1,465 inhabitants and 470 households in January 2020. Biezenmortel has a primary school called Franciscus and a community center called De Vorselaer. Centrally located in the village, there is a former Capuchin monastery called Beukenhof, that now serves as a group accommodation. The Sint Josephkerk, which was located inside the monastery, closed down in 2019.

It consists of some 40 buildings including a chapel and houses around 200 intellectually disabled people.

Before 2021, Biezenmortel was part of the former municipality Haaren.

References 

Populated places in North Brabant
Tilburg